The Civil Aviation Directorate of the Republic of Serbia (Директорат цивилног ваздухопловства Републике Србије, Direktorat civilnog vazduhoplovstva Republike Srbije) is the civil aviation authority of Serbia.

The Accidents and Incidents Investigation and Risks Analysis Office investigates aviation accidents and incidents.

References

External links

 Civil Aviation Directorate
 Civil Aviation Directorate 

Serbia
Aviation organizations based in Serbia
Government of Serbia
Organizations investigating aviation accidents and incidents
Civil aviation in Serbia